There have been four baronetcies created for persons with the surname Gibson, one in the Baronetage of Nova Scotia and three in the Baronetage of the United Kingdom. Two of the creations are extinct.

The Gibson Baronetcy, of Keirhill in the City of Edinburgh, was created in the Baronetage of Nova Scotia on 31 December 1702. For more information on this creation, see Gibson-Craig-Carmichael baronets.

The Gibson Baronetcy, of Regent Terrace in the City of Edinburgh, was created in the Baronetage of the United Kingdom on 23 November 1909 for James Gibson. He represented Edinburgh East in the House of Commons as a Liberal between 1909 and 1912. The title became extinct on his death in 1912.

The Gibson Baronetcy, of Great Warley in the County of Essex, was created in the Baronetage of the United Kingdom on 1 February 1926 for Herbert Gibson. He was a solicitor and served as president of the Law Society in 1925. The title became extinct on the death of the fourth Baronet in 1997.

The Gibson Baronetcy, of Linconia, and of Faccombe in the County of Southampton, was created in the Baronetage of the United Kingdom on 10 August 1931 for Herbert Gibson. He was an Argentina-based merchant and served as Chairman of the Inter-Allied Commission for Purchase of Cereals in Argentina and Uruguay from 1917 to 1919.

Gibson baronets, of Keirhill (1702)
see Gibson-Craig-Carmichael baronets

Gibson baronets, of Regent Terrace (1909)
Sir James Puckering Gibson, 1st Baronet (1849–1912)

Gibson baronets, of Great Warley (1926)
Sir Herbert Gibson, 1st Baronet (1851–1932)
Sir Kenneth Lloyd Gibson, 2nd Baronet (1888–1967)
Sir Ackroyd Herbert Gibson, 3rd Baronet (1893–1975) succeeded his elder brother
Sir David Ackroyd Gibson, 4th Baronet (1922–1997)

Gibson baronets, of Linconia and Faccombe (1931)
Sir Herbert Gibson, 1st Baronet (1868–1934)
Sir Christopher Herbert Gibson, 2nd Baronet (1897–1962)
Sir Christopher Herbert Gibson, 3rd Baronet (1921–1994)
Sir Christopher Herbert Gibson, 4th Baronet (born 1948)

References
Kidd, Charles & Williamson, David (editors). Debrett's Peerage and Baronetage (1990 edition). New York: St Martin's Press, 1990,

External links
Short history of the Gibson family of Argentina

Baronetcies in the Baronetage of Nova Scotia
Baronetcies in the Baronetage of the United Kingdom
Extinct baronetcies in the Baronetage of the United Kingdom